Louis Stanislas Renoult (born 29 May 1972), just known as Stanislas, is a French singer. After several musical collaborations since 2000, he met success in 2008 with his first solo album L'Équilibre instable.

Biography
He was born in Fontainebleau, Seine-et-Marne, the son of François Renoult, a musician who had worked with Antoine, notably on the song "Je l'appelle Canelle".

Stanislas entered the Conducting program at the École Normale de Musique de Paris when he was 19. Three years later, he left the school with honors and became the assistant of musical director of the Orchestra of Massy Dominique Rouits where he regularly continues to direct classical works. He also composed, works on arrangements and produced many pop singles for artists such as Daniel Levi, Calogero (with whom he recorded a duet), Charles Aznavour, Maurane, Kool Shen, Céline Dion.

In 2000, Stanislas formed with Gioacchino (Calogero's brother) the band Pure Orchestra and signed with Atletico Records, the label of Pascal Obispo. Their first single "U&I" was aired on radio in summer 2001 and the album Singing' dog was released in February 2002. In 2004, Stanislas began to write his first solo album and decided to start a new collaboration with his brother Thibaud. They recorded Thibaud's first studio album, entitled Les Pas perdus, then Stanislas' debut album L'Équilibre instable released in late 2007 (Polydor/Universal). His first single "Le Manège" achieved success in France. It was followed by "La Belle de Mai", then by "La débâcle des sentiments", a duet with Calogero.

After a great success of his two concerts at the Alambra of Paris in March 2008, Stanislas was on stage in France and Belgium in November and December 2008 (Massy, Lille, Nantes, Tours, the Olympia of Paris, Ludres, Aix-en-Provence, Toulouse, Bordeaux, Troyes, Brussels, Sanary, Lyon).

He revealed that he first wanted to participate as a contestant in the French version of Star Academy. A fourth single off the album was released, "Les lignes de ma main" in March 2009.

Stanislas was nominated at the 2009 NRJ Music Awards in the categories 'French group/duet of the year' and 'Music video of the year' for his single "La débâcle des sentiments", but didn't win.

Discography

Albums

Singles

1 Duet with Calogero

References

External links
 Official site
 Stanislas-official on Dailymotion

1972 births
Living people
People from Fontainebleau
French pop singers
French singer-songwriters
21st-century French singers
21st-century French male singers
French male singer-songwriters